Wolfgang Lüderitz may refer to:

 Wolfgang Lüderitz (composer) (1926–2012), German composer of choral music
 Wolfgang Lüderitz (pentathlete) (born 1936), German pentathlete